Gołaszyn may refer to the following places:
Gołaszyn, Oborniki County in Greater Poland Voivodeship (west-central Poland)
Gołaszyn, Rawicz County in Greater Poland Voivodeship (west-central Poland)
Gołaszyn, Lublin Voivodeship (east Poland)
Gołaszyn, Lubusz Voivodeship (west Poland)